Tellian is a state constituency in Sarawak, Malaysia, that has been represented in the Sarawak State Legislative Assembly since 2016.

The state constituency was created in the 2015 redistribution and is mandated to return a single member to the Sarawak State Legislative Assembly under the first past the post voting system.

History
2016–present: The constituency contains the polling districts of Baoh, Penat, Sebakong, Ulu Baoh, Dijih, Ulu Sikat, Nanga Sikat, Engkerbai, Petanak Mukah, Tellian, Judan, Kuala Lama, Tellian Laut, Mukah, Penakop Permai.

Representation history

Election results

References

Sarawak state constituencies